The High Sheriff of Buckinghamshire, in common with other counties, was originally the King's representative on taxation upholding the law in Saxon times. The word Sheriff evolved from 'shire-reeve'.

Sheriff is the oldest secular office under the Crown.  Formerly the sheriff was the principal law enforcement officer in the county but over the centuries most of the responsibilities associated with the post have been transferred elsewhere or are now defunct, so that its functions are now largely ceremonial. Under the provisions of the Local Government Act 1972, on 1 April 1974 the office previously known as Sheriff was retitled High Sheriff.

The title of sheriff is therefore much older than the other Crown appointment, the Lord Lieutenant of Buckinghamshire, which came about in 1535.

Unlike the Lord Lieutenant of Buckinghamshire, which is generally held from appointment until the holder's death or incapacity, the title of High Sheriff is appointed or reappointed annually. The High Sheriff is assisted by an Under-Sheriff of Buckinghamshire.

List of sheriffs

Before 1125
Before 1066: Godric, (killed in 1066)
1066–c. 1084: Ansculf de Picquigny
c. 1087-1094: Hugh de Beauchamp
c.1100: Geoffrey
1124: Richard of Winchester

1125 to 1575
For 1125 to 1575, see Sheriff of Bedfordshire and Buckinghamshire.

1575–1599

1600–1699

1700–1799

1800–1899

1900–1973

2000–present

See also
 High Sheriff of Bedfordshire and Buckinghamshire

Notes

References

Bibliography

 (with amendments of 1963, Public Record Office)

 
Local government in Buckinghamshire
Buckinghamshire
High Sheriffs